TVRI Sumatera Utara (TVRI North Sumatra, legally LPP TVRI Stasiun Sumatera Utara) is a regional public television station owned-and-operated by TVRI, serving whole province of North Sumatra, Indonesia. TVRI Sumatera Utara studios are located on Jalan Putri Hijau (Green Princess Street), Medan, and its main transmitter is located in Bandar Baru, Sibolangit, Deli Serdang.

History
On June 27, 1967, the committee "TVRI North Sumatra Construction Foundation" (Yayasan Pembangunan TVRI Sumatera Utara) was established by the partnership between the provincial government, the provincial parliament, regional TNI, and Pertamina; led by Lt. Col. Wahid Lubis and Lt. Col. Ridwan Hutagalung. The purpose of the foundation is to find sources of funds for the station's construction and purchase of a number of broadcast equipment.

TVRI Sumatera Utara first signed on the air on 9 December 1970 as TVRI Medan; it is considered the second TVRI regional station to be founded after TVRI Yogyakarta five years prior.

In December 2017, the TVRI Sumatera Utara digital transmitters are inaugurated by North Sumatra governor Tengku Erry Nuradi. The full digital transmitters were located in Bandar Baru and Sibolga, whereas the dual cast transmitters are located in Simarjarunjung, Gunung Sitoli, Padang Sidempuan and Parapat.

Programming
TVRI Sumatera Utara broadcasts 28 hours of locally produced programming each week (with 4 hours each day), the same duration as other TVRI regional stations.

References

External links
 TVRI Sumatera Utara brief information on TVRI website
 TVRI Sumatera Utara Facebook page

Television stations in Indonesia
Television channels and stations established in 1970
1970 establishments in Indonesia
Mass media in Medan
TVRI